Comboios Biological Reserve is a biological reserve in the state of Espírito Santo, Brazil.

Location

Comboios Biological Reserve is in the municipalities of Aracruz and Linhares, Espírito Santo.
It became part of the Central Atlantic Forest Ecological Corridor, created in 2002.

Conservation

As of 2009 the Biological Reserve was a "strict nature reserve" under IUCN protected area category Ia.
Objectives are full preservation of biota and other natural attributes.
The reserve is the state headquarters for Projeto TAMAR, the turtle conservation organization.
The reserve's aquarium contains giant sea turtles, and the residents of nearby Regência make their living from turtle conservation as well as fishing.
Protected species in the conservation unit are Amazona rhodocorytha, Atta robusta, Maned sloth,  Cnemidophorus and Panthera onca.

References

Sources

1984 establishments in Brazil
Biological reserves of Brazil
Protected areas of Espírito Santo
Protected areas established in 1984